Rhodoblastus acidophilus, formerly known as Rhodopseudomonas acidophila, is a gram-negative purple non-sulfur bacteria. The cells are rod-shaped or ovoid, 1.0 to 1.3 μm wide and 2 to 5 μm long. They are motile by means of polar flagella, and they multiply by budding. The photopigments consist of bacteriochlorophyll a and carotenoids of the spirilloxanthin series. All strains can grow either under anaerobic conditions in the light or under microaerophilic to aerobic conditions in the dark.

References

Further reading

External links
Type strain of Rhodoblastus acidophilus at BacDive -  the Bacterial Diversity Metadatabase

Hyphomicrobiales